DeAngelo Eugene Hall (born November 19, 1983) is a former American football defensive back who played 14 seasons in the National Football League (NFL). He played college football for Virginia Tech and was drafted by the Atlanta Falcons eighth overall in the 2004 NFL Draft. Hall played half a season for the Oakland Raiders before being traded to the Washington Redskins in 2008, playing for them until retiring following the 2017 season. He was a cornerback for the majority of his career before playing at free safety during his last few seasons.

Hall was invited to three Pro Bowls in his career: two with the Falcons and one with the Redskins. In 2010, he tied an NFL record by recording four interceptions in a game against the Chicago Bears. He also holds the NFL record for most fumble return yardage in a career, while his five career fumble return touchdowns ranks second behind Jason Taylor. Following his playing career, he began working as an on-air football analyst for several networks and programs as well as on the radio broadcast team for the Washington Commanders.

Early life
Hall attended Deep Creek High School in Chesapeake, Virginia, where he lettered in high school football, basketball, and track and field. At Deep Creek, he was a teammate of Chicago Bears' linebacker James Anderson and defensive end Darryl Tapp, who all also played together at Virginia Tech.

Football
As a junior at Deep Creek High School, Hall averaged 9.8 yards a carry as a running back and had seven interceptions as a cornerback. He was chosen as the district offensive and defensive player of the year and was a first-team pick as a defensive back on the All-Tidewater team.

As a senior, Hall scored 30 touchdowns and rushed for over 1,300 yards while averaging ten yards per carry. He also intercepted nine passes, posted over 100 tackles and had 16 tackles for loss. During his senior season, Hall helped lead Deep Creek to the state AAA Division Six championship game, which they lost 28-26, to Centreville High School.

After his senior season, Hall earned all-district player of the year honors and was named to the all-district team as a running back, defensive back and return man. He was also named Tidewater Player of the Year and the Norfolk Sports Club Player of the Year. The Associated Press picked him as a first-team Group AAA defensive back, and he was ranked the No. 2 player in Virginia by The Roanoke Times.

Track and field
Hall was a sprinter on the track team and placed sixth at the junior nationals in the 60-meter dash as a junior with a time of 6.93. He also placed third in the state AAA long jump as a senior, with a jump of 7.06 meters. He also ran the 55 metres in 6.40 seconds and was a member of the 4 × 100 m (41.76s) relay squad.

College career
Hall recorded 190 tackles, 20 passes defensed, eight interceptions, two forced fumbles, one fumble recovery, and seven receptions for 86 yards with one touchdown in his three-year career at Virginia Tech. He returned 56 punts for 839 yards and five touchdowns. His 839 yards rank third on the Big East Conference career-record chart while his five returns for touchdowns rank second in conference history. Hall is one of the few players in college football history to score touchdowns on offense, defense, and special teams during their collegiate career. His accomplishments in college led to his induction into the Virginia Tech Sports Hall of Fame.

Hall majored in secondary education while at Virginia Tech.

Freshman season
Hall started strong in college, and turned in the fastest 40-yard dash among the freshmen at 4.37 in preseason strength and conditioning testing and also bench pressed 300 pounds. His first collegiate action was in the season-opener against Connecticut, during which he had three tackles, two assists and his first college interception. Hall made his first career start against Temple, during which he played a season-high 78 total snaps, recording six solo tackles, five assists, two passes broken up and an interception. He had four tackles, including one for a 3-yard loss, during Virginia Tech's loss in the 2002 Gator Bowl against Florida State.

Hall played in all 11 games, starting one, and recorded 24 solo stops, 18 assists, three pass breakups and three interceptions.

Sophomore season
Hall started ten games at cornerback and also returned punts as a sophomore. In the first game of the season against Arkansas State, he returned a punt 69 yards for a touchdown, and then returned an interception 49 yards for a touchdown. He recorded four tackles and a 51-yard punt return for a touchdown against Rutgers which helped earn him the Big East Conference Co-Special Teams Player of the Week honors. Hall had an assisted tackle and a pass broken up in Virginia Tech's victory in the 2002 San Francisco Bowl against Air Force. He was ranked seventh in the nation in punt returns, averaging 16.0 yards per return, and had a long of 71 yards and two touchdowns. He had 36 solo tackles and 19 assists, four interceptions, 12 passes broken up and a forced fumble.

During spring training, Hall posted the fastest forty time ever for a Tech football player with a timing of 4.15 in Virginia Tech's Rector Field House.

Junior season
As a junior, Hall became the first Tech player in nearly six years to play both ways in a game when he saw ten plays on offense and 28 on defense against Central Florida. During the game, he caught two passes for 41 yards, including a 29-yard touchdown, and had two solo tackles and an assist on defense. During the game against Syracuse, he scored three touchdowns, and set a Virginia Tech and Big East record with two punt returns for touchdowns, as well as a 24-yard touchdown run on offense. After the game, Hall earned Big East Special Teams Player of the Week honors. He had eight solo tackles and three assists against Miami, as well as a forced fumble, fumble recovery and 28-yard touchdown all on the same play to open Tech's scoring. This performance earned him Big East Defensive Player of the Week honors.

After the season, Hall was a second-team All-American selection, and was a semifinalist for the Jim Thorpe Award, given to the nation's top defensive back, as he ranked sixth on the team with a career-high 93 tackles.

Professional career

Atlanta Falcons

Hall was drafted by the Atlanta Falcons with the 8th overall pick of the 2004 NFL Draft. He finished his first season with 35 tackles and two interceptions. He also set the record for being the youngest player to return an interception for a touchdown (21 years, 44 days).

One of Hall's finest moments came when he was assigned to one of the NFL's premier wide receivers, Terrell Owens of the Philadelphia Eagles, on Monday Night Football. Although Owens gained 112 receiving yards, Hall was able to stop Owens on many of the Eagles' third down attempts, and his tight coverage of Owens on the last Eagle possession of the game helped Atlanta clinch a 14-10 victory on September 12, 2005.

Hall performed well during the 2005-2006 season, especially in prime time games. In the four prime time games he  played, he had three interceptions, one forced fumble, and one fumble recovery.

During a Monday Night Football game in 2005, after an interception, Hall held up a sign that read, "Aloha, see you in Hawaii", obviously making a case for a Pro Bowl bid. In 2005, Hall was selected to the Pro Bowl for the first time in his career. While at the 2005 Pro Bowl, Hall was the winner of the "NFL's Fastest Man Competition", a contest with the fastest players in the NFL.

Hall is close friends with many elite receivers in the NFL, including former NFL wide receiver Chad Johnson. On an appearance on the NFL Network, Johnson and Hall made a wager on their upcoming 2006 matchup: should Johnson catch two touchdown passes, Hall would be obliged to wait tables at an Atlanta restaurant owned by Bengals tackle Willie Anderson. Should Johnson fail, he would be forced to shave the bleach-blonde mohawk he had grown over the off-season. After the game was over (which the Falcons won) it was accepted that Hall was the "winner," as Johnson only caught one touchdown pass. Johnson held up his end of the bargain and shaved his mohawk.

In the 2007 preseason, Hall shaved "I own 85" into the back of his head in reference to his ongoing rivalry with Johnson. Johnson had the last laugh however, breezing past Hall on occasions and making five catches for more than 80 yards and a touchdown.

In the Falcons 2007 game against the New Orleans Saints, Hall showed his support for fellow Falcon and former Hokie Michael Vick by carrying a poster of Vick onto the field with him, and also wearing "MV7" written on the shade under his eyes. Earlier that day, Vick, Hall's Virginia Tech teammate, was sentenced to 23 months in prison on dogfighting charges. Hall was fined $10,000 by the league for his actions.

Oakland Raiders

On March 20, 2008, the Falcons traded Hall to the Oakland Raiders for their second-round pick in the 2008 NFL Draft and fifth-round pick in the 2009 NFL Draft. Shortly after he agreed on a seven-year, $70 million contract. However, Hall was released on November 5, 2008.

Washington Redskins
Hall signed a one-year contract with the Washington Redskins on November 8, 2008. The team released cornerback Leigh Torrence to make room for Hall. In his first game with the Redskins, against the Dallas Cowboys, Hall intercepted a pass from Cowboys quarterback Tony Romo. He finished the 2008 season 25 tackles, two interceptions and eight pass deflections in seven games (four starts).

2009 season
As an unrestricted free agent in the 2009 offseason, Hall agreed to a six-year contract with the Redskins on February 27. The deal contained $23 million in guaranteed money and had a maximum value of $55 million.

2010 season

During a Week 7 matchup against the Chicago Bears, on October 24, 2010, Hall recorded four interceptions, tying an NFL record, off of Jay Cutler. He returned one of the interceptions 92 yards for a touchdown. Hall's jersey from this game was sent by request to the Pro Football Hall of Fame for display in a gallery. Midway through the season, Hall was voted as a co-defensive captain, along with London Fletcher.
Hall was named the 2011 Pro Bowl MVP due to his performance which included six tackles, an interception, and a fumble returned for a touchdown.

2011 season
In the 2011 season, Hall continued to be co-defensive captain along with Fletcher.
After the Redskins lost to the Dallas Cowboys in overtime in Week 11, Hall said to the press, "The way I'm playing right now, they need to cut me, because I'm definitely not worth what I'm getting."
Hall would then record five tackles, five pass break-ups, and an interception in Week 12 against the Seattle Seahawks. Due to his performance in Week 12, Hall was named NFC defensive player of the week on November 30, 2011.
Hall finished the season recording 90 combined tackles, 16 pass breakups, and three interceptions, and a forced fumble.

2012 season
During the 2012 preseason, it was reported that Hall would switch from the outside corner position to the nickelback position. He recorded his first interception of the 2012 season, in Week 4 against the Tampa Bay Buccaneers. In the Week 6 win against the Minnesota Vikings, Hall intercepted Christian Ponder in the endzone within the last few minutes of the game, securing the Redskins' victory. Late in the fourth quarter, he was ejected from the Week 8 game against the Pittsburgh Steelers after removing his helmet and verbally confronting a referee. On November 15, 2012, Hall was fined $30,000 by the NFL after his actions against the referee. In the Week 11 win against the Philadelphia Eagles, he recorded his third interception of the season, which positioned the Redskins to score the first touchdown of the game. The following week in the Redskins' victory over the Dallas Cowboys on Thanksgiving, he picked off Tony Romo, as well as, recovered the ball after the Cowboys did an onside kick and returned the ball for 27 yards. Though he had the chance to score, Hall slid before reaching the endzone to allow the Redskins' offense to go on the field and take a knee, running out the clock, and ensuring the Redskins' win.

2013 season
On March 11, 2013, Hall was released by the Redskins after five seasons with the team; citing salary cap issues as the reason. Hall would have been due $8 million had he not been released before the start of the new league year on March 12, 2013. On April 1, Hall re-signed with the Redskins on a one-year deal worth roughly $2.25 million. In Week 1, against the Philadelphia Eagles, he returned a fumble 75 yards for a touchdown. In the Week 3 game against the Detroit Lions, Hall picked off quarterback Matthew Stafford and returned the ball for a touchdown. The interception was Hall's fortieth career interception and the touchdown was his eighth defensive touchdown (fourth from an interception). On October 27, in a Week 8 game against the 6-1 Denver Broncos, Hall intercepted a pass from quarterback Peyton Manning, returning it 26 yards for a touchdown. It was his second interception of the season and his second return for a touchdown, ninth overall in his career. He subsequently intercepted Manning a second time for his third pick of the year.

2014 season
After an impressive 2013 season, Hall signed a four-year contract extension to remain with Redskins on February 19, 2014. In Week 3 against the Eagles, Hall left the game with an apparent back foot heel injury. The next day, an MRI revealed that Hall had a torn Achilles tendon, which prematurely ended his 2014 season. Five weeks after suffering the injury, Hall re-tore his Achilles while at home recovering from the initial injury.

2015 season
In November 2015, Hall switched over to the safety position full-time, marking a move that had been rumored to be happening for years.

In a game against the Philadelphia Eagles on December 26, Hall scooped up a mishandled handoff by quarterback Sam Bradford and returned it for a touchdown. With the play, Hall became the first player in NFL history to score five touchdowns off fumble recoveries and five off interception returns in a career. The play also helped the Redskins win the game, and in effect, clinched the NFC East division title for the first time since 2012.

2016 season
Hall tore his ACL in Week 3 against the New York Giants and was placed on injured reserve.

2017 season
Hall was placed on the physically unable to perform list to start the season due to the ACL injury suffered in 2016. He was activated off PUP on November 3, 2017 for the team's Week 9 game. He started at free safety and returned kicks. Hall announced his retirement following the season.

NFL career statistics

Regular season

Records
 Most passes intercepted in a single game (4, tied with several others)
 Most career fumble return yards (328)
 Second-most career fumble return touchdowns (5)
 Only player with at least five fumble return touchdowns and five interception return touchdowns

Post-playing career
Following his retirement, Hall worked as a guest analyst for NBC Sports Washington and Fox Sports 1 before being hired by NFL Network in June 2019 as an in-studio analyst for their NFL Total Access and Good Morning Football programs. He joined the Washington Football Team to become their gameday radio analyst in 2020, serving alongside play by play announcer Bram Weinstein and host Julie Donaldson.

On September 1, 2022, Hall was inducted into Washington's Greatest Players list in honor of the franchise's 90th anniversary.

Personal life
Hall was sometimes called "MeAngelo" during the early part of his career for his outspoken demeanor and style of play. He is a father of six children. He has advocated for the passage of the FIT Kids Act, which is federal legislation that would require school districts to report on students' physical activity and to give children health and nutritional information.

Hall has been longtime friends with former defensive end Darryl Tapp since childhood, with the two having gone to the same school from elementary school throughout college. They would become teammates again when they both played for the Redskins in 2013.

References

External links

 
 Virginia Tech Hokies bio

1983 births
Living people
African-American players of American football
American football cornerbacks
American football safeties
American radio sports announcers
Atlanta Falcons players
National Conference Pro Bowl players
National Football League announcers
Oakland Raiders players
Sportspeople from Chesapeake, Virginia
Players of American football from Atlanta
Virginia Tech Hokies football players
Washington Redskins players
Washington Football Team announcers
21st-century African-American sportspeople
20th-century African-American people
Ed Block Courage Award recipients